Hypsotropa makulanella is a species of snout moth in the genus Hypsotropa. It was described by Joseph de Joannis in 1927 and is known from Mozambique.

References

Endemic fauna of Mozambique
Moths described in 1927
Anerastiini
Lepidoptera of Mozambique
Moths of Sub-Saharan Africa